Wayne R. Parry is an American politician from Maine. A Republican, Parry represented District 10 in the Maine House of Representatives from 2010 to 2018, when he could not run again due to term limits. He ran unsuccessfully in 2008. In 2020, he filed to run for his old seat, against incumbent Democratic Representative Henry Ingwersen.

References

1963 births
Living people
People from Arundel, Maine
Republican Party members of the Maine House of Representatives
21st-century American politicians